The Skol Tournament was a golf tournament that was played from 1970 to 1983. It was a limited-field 72-hole stroke-play event, played in Scotland. It was played over three days, with the first two days being a pro-am, the professionals playing 36 holes on the final day. Initially the field consisted of 12 professionals, increasing to 14 in 1975, 20 in 1979 and 25 in 1982.

Winners

References

Golf tournaments in Scotland
Recurring sporting events established in 1970
Recurring sporting events disestablished in 1983
1970 establishments in Scotland
1983 disestablishments in Scotland